Six-time defending champion Rafael Nadal defeated David Ferrer in the final, 6–4, 7–5 to win the singles tennis title at the 2011 Monte-Carlo Masters.

Seeds
The top eight seeds receive a bye into the second round.

Qualifying

Draw

Finals

Top half

Section 1

Section 2

Bottom half

Section 3

Section 4

External links
 Main draw

Monte-Carlo Rolex Masters - Singles
2011 Monte-Carlo Rolex Masters